Arun Kumar Basak (born October 17, 1941) is a Bangladeshi physicist. He is Professor Emeritus in the Department of Physics, University of Rajshahi.

Early life and education
Basak was born in Radhanagor of Pabna town, Bengal Presidency, British India  to parents Haripada Basak and Usha Rani Basak. Basak matriculated in 1957 securing First Division from R.M. Academy. He secured the second position in the merit list in the Intermediate Science Examination held under University of Rajshahi in 1959 from Edward College. He was placed in First Class with the first position in the B.Sc. (Hons) examination from Rajshahi College in 1961. In M.Sc. Examination (1963) from University of Rajshahi, he obtained the first position in first class and was awarded an RU Gold medal.

Career
In December 1963, Basak joined the University of Rajshahi as a lecturer in the Department of Physics. In 1978, Basak was appointed as an Associate Professor by the University of Dhaka, but he preferred to stay in Rajshahi where he became Associate Professor in the later part of 1978.
He was awarded a merit scholarship for securing the highest marks in the Faculty of Science and got admission at Imperial College, London. Owing to the 1965 Indo-Pak war, he could not avail the opportunity. In 1972, he went to the University of Birmingham with a Commonwealth Scholarship. He worked with the tensor polarized deuteron and the polarized 3He beams, the latter being the only one of its kind in the world. He earned his Ph.D. degree in 1975.

Professional membership
 Senior associate of the International Centre for Theoretical Physics at Trieste, Italy during 1987–96. 
 Elected as a fellow of the Bangladesh Academy of Sciences in 2001
 Elected as a fellow of the Institute of Physics (London) in 2001. 
 Was a principal investigator from Bangladesh in a collaborative project, which funded by the US National Science Foundation. 
 The fellow of Bangladesh Physical Society from 1987 (life membership).
 A member of American Physical Society during 2000-03 and from 2013(life membership).

Others
 Was a post doctoral fellow in Nuclear Physics, The Ohio State University, United States during 1981–82.
 An associate member of ICTP, Italy during 1988–1995.
 Visiting scholar at Southern Illinois University, USA in 1997.
 Visiting Professor at Kent State University, USA.

Awards
 Bangladesh Academy of Sciences Gold Medal in Physical Sciences (2003)
 Star Lifetime Award on Physics (2016)

References

External links
 Top Publications of A. K. Basak

1941 births
Living people
Bengali Hindus
Bangladeshi Hindus
Bangladeshi physicists
University of Rajshahi alumni
Academic staff of the University of Rajshahi
Alumni of the University of Birmingham
Bengali physicists
Nuclear physicists
Theoretical physicists
Fellows of Bangladesh Academy of Sciences
Physics educators
People from Pabna District
Rajshahi College alumni
Fellows of the Bangladesh Physical Society
Pabna Edward College alumni